is a railway station on the Hokuriku Railroad Ishikawa Line in Hakusan, Ishikawa, Japan, operated by the private railway operator Hokuriku Railroad (Hokutetsu).

Lines

Station layout
The station consists of one side platform serving a single bi-directional track. The station is unattended.

Adjacent stations

History
Oyanagi Station opened on 22 June 1915.

Surrounding area
 Ishikawa Prefectural Route 179

See also
 List of railway stations in Japan

References

External links

  

Railway stations in Ishikawa Prefecture
Railway stations in Japan opened in 1915
Hokuriku Railroad Ishikawa Line
Hakusan, Ishikawa